Margate is a coastal resort town in the Kwa-Zulu Natal province, about 20 kilometres southwest of Port Shepstone. The river which flows into the sea at Margate is called "Nkhongweni" (place of entreaty) as the original inhabitants of the area were reputed to be so mean resulting in travellers begging for hospitality.

It is one of the major hubs for tourists who are looking to visit the eastern coastline of South Africa.

History
In 1908, Henry Richardson, an English surveyor laid out the town and named it Margate after another seaside resort on the northern coast of the county of Kent, in the United Kingdom.

Margate hit the world headlines in 1922 (although this date is often disputed and stated as 1924) when an enormous, white, furry creature (dubbed "Trunko" due to it having an elephantine trunk) was washed up on the beach. The "Margate monster" was too decomposed to be identified.

Geography
Margate is located on a series of hills overlooking the Indian Ocean with the altitude rising from Margate Beach and the CBD on the coastline to Margate Airport, the highest point of Margate. Margate is located about 15 km south-west of Port Shepstone and 127 km southwest of Durban. It is situated between Uvongo and Ramsgate in which Uvongo lies north and Ramsgate lies south. 

Margate's Central Business District (CBD) similarly to the nearby towns of Shelly Beach and Uvongo is stringed along 'Marine Drive' with several business and hotels stringing from Margate Hotel to Desroches Hotel.

Communities
The greater area of Margate includes 13 suburbs with some being formally independent communities (eg. Shelly Beach), extending from Shelly Beach in the north to Ramsgate South in the south. It includes the following suburbs:
Beacon Rocks
Lawrence Rocks
Manaba Beach
Margate Beach
Margate North Beach
Ramsgate
Ramsgate Beach
Ramsgate South
Shelly Beach
St Michael's-on-sea
Uvongo
Uvongo Beach
Windsor-on-Sea
Apart from these listed suburbs, Margate Extension 3 and 7 located west of the R61/N2 form part of Margate proper but are not official suburbs of the town.

Economy

Retail
Margate is one of the largest retail nodes on the KwaZulu-Natal South Coast with a large concentration of shopping centres and other retail facilities. The town has four shopping centres (excluding those of Greater Margate- eg. Shelly Centre) and include:

 Emoyeni Centre which has Checkout as its anchor tenant is located in the precinct of the Margate Taxi Rank, just above/west of the CBD.
 Hibsicus Mall, the largest shopping centre in Margate which has Checkers as its anchor tenant is located above the CBD, on Wartski Drive
 Margate Centre is a small shopping centre which has PicknPay as its anchor tenant is located adjacent to the Hibiscus Mall on the corner of Wartski Drive and National Road. It has
 Margate Mall, popularly known as 'Shoprite Mall' has Shoprite as its anchor tenant and is located on Marine Drive in Margate's CBD

Nearby and larger shopping centres in the vicinity of Margate are Southcoast Mall and Shelly Centre, both located in Shelly Beach.

Tourism

With Margate being a major seaside resort, majority of its economy comes from tourism. Signs of this can be found on the coastline where hotels and holiday accommodation apartments lie. 

Reputable hotels and holiday accommodation in Margate include the Margate Hotel, Margate Sands, Seagull Holiday Flats and the Desroches Hotel. 

It features Blue Flag Beaches for swimming, snorkelling, and surfing. Many apartment buildings offer accommodation for residents and visitors. It also contains a shopping street and many restaurants, pubs, and nightclubs, Margate is a spot where many South Africans and foreign visitors spend their vacation.  

Margate is busiest during school and public holidays when inland residents travel to the coast. Christmas and Easter are especially busy times, with Margate's main street often clogged with heavy traffic during these times.

Margate is one of the most visited tourist destinations in South Africa and had the third highest inflow of new visitors in December 2019 in South Africa after Plettenberg Bay and Mossel Bay in the Western Cape Province. This means that Margate had the highest inflow of new visitors in December 2019 in KwaZulu-Natal.

The Margate Country Club is located on the western outskirts of Margate on Wingate Drive. Other golf courses in the broader South Coast area are in Port Shepstone, Port Edward, Southbroom, Hibberdene, Pennington and Scottburgh.

Education

Public Schools
 Hibiscus Primary School
 Margate Middle School
 Margate Primary School

Private Schools
 South Coast Academy
Hibiscus International Academy

Infrastructure

Transportation

Road
Margate has access to one highway, the R61 freeway (future N2 Wild Coast Toll Route). The R61/N2 (South Coast Toll Road) runs through Margate, bypassing the CBD to the west and the suburbs of Extension 3 and 7 to the east. The freeway links the town to Port Shepstone and Durban in the north-east and Port Edward, Mbizana and Mthatha in the south-west. Access to Margate from the R61/N2 is obtained through the Seaslopes Avenue interchange (Exit 33), north of Margate and Alford Avenue (Exit 29) interchange, south of Margate.  

The R620 (Marine Drive/National Road) runs along the coast and bypassing the CBD by circling around it to the east. The regional route links the town to Uvongo, Shelly Beach and Port Shepstone in the north-east and Ramsgate, Southbroom and Port Edward (via the R61) in the south-west. The R620 can also be used as an alternative route to Shelly Beach, Port Shepstone, Durban and Kokstad (via the R102 in Port Shepstone) for motorists avoiding the Izotsha Ramp Plaza in Shelly Beach and the Oribi Toll Plaza in Port Shepstone.

'Seaslopes Avenue'/'Wingate Avenue' is a small secondary road which starts at the intersection with the R620, between Uvongo and Manaba Beach links Margate to the R61/N2, Margate Country Club and the Gayridge agricultural holdings in the north-west.

'Izotsha Road' is a small secondary road that borders Margate to the west, running adjacent to Margate Airport's runway and links Margate to Ramsgate and Southbroom in the south-west, Oatlands Landfill, Gamalakhe, Izotsha and Marburg in the north-west.

Airports
Margate Airport is located on the western outskirts of Margate in its Extension 3 neighbourhood. It is a small, regional, airport with easy and quick access facilities. There is one scheduled domestic route to Johannesburg offered by CemAir. King Shaka International Airport, near Durban is about 166 km north-east of Margate.

Health systems
Margate only has one hospital, Netcare Margate Hospital which is a private hospital owned by one of South Africa's largest healthcare groups, Netcare. Margate also has one public clinic located in the CBD whilst the nearest public hospital is located in Port Shepstone.

See also
Black December

References

External links

 Margate, South Coast Accommodation and Adventure Guide
 360 degree Virtual Tour of Margate Beach

See also 
 Margate Airport

Populated places in the Ray Nkonyeni Local Municipality
Populated coastal places in South Africa